Lauderdale Lakes is a census-designated place in the town of La Grange, Walworth County, Wisconsin, United States. Its population was 1,283 as of the 2020 census.

History 
The lakes were named after James Lauderdale. James moved to the area in 1841 along with his family. The New York native built the first residential building in 1842. James, his brother-in-law, and his cousin each purchased 160 acres of the Homestead Act price of $1.25 an acre. James and his family went back to New York and shortly returned in September 1842. James built a log cabin along the shore. James' wife didn't like living next to the water so they built a larger house next to the road in 1855. Eight years later, Chicago native John Wheeler bought the shoreline property and started building the Sterlingworth Hotel in 1893.

Demographics

References 

Census-designated places in Walworth County, Wisconsin
Census-designated places in Wisconsin